Henry Dixon may refer to:
Henry Aldous Dixon (1890–1967), U.S. Representative from Utah
Henry Dixon (Irish republican)
Henry Dixon (photographer) (1820–1893), English photographer
Henry Horatio Dixon (1869–1953), plant biologist and professor at Trinity College Dublin
Henry Dixon (Gaelic footballer) (1918–1999), Irish Gaelic footballer
Hal Dixon (biochemist) (1928–2008), his son, British biochemist
Henry Hall Dixon (1822–1870), English sporting writer
Henry Dixon (priest) (1874–1939), Anglican priest
Harry D. Dixon (1925–2012), member of the Georgia House of Representatives

See also
Hal Dixon (disambiguation)
Henry Dickson (born 1966), Nigerian politician
Henry Newton Dickson (1866–1922), Scottish geographer